{{Infobox person
| name          = Luci'la Campos''
| birth_name    = Clara Lucila Campos Marcial
| birth_date    = 
| birth_place   = 
| death_date    = 
| death_place   = Lima
| nationality   = Peruvian 
| other_names   = "la Morena Espectáculo" and "Reina de las Polladas"
| occupation    = singer
| years_active  = 
| known_for     = 
| notable_works = 
}}Clara Lucila Campos Marcial''' (16 August 1938 – 12 December 2016 in Lima) was a Peruvian singer known as "la Morena Espectáculo" and "Reina de las Polladas".

Discography
Toro Mata (Virrey, 1973)
 Perú Negro: Gran Premio del Festival Hispanoamericano de la Danza y la Canción (Virrey, 1973)
 La Jarana es con Lucila Campos (Virrey, 1974)
    Conjunto Perú Negro: Son de los Diablos (Virrey, 1974)
   Ritmo Negro: Con el conjunto de chocolate y su Eleggua (Virrey, 1975)
   ¡¡¡ Que Tal... Trio !!! (Iempsa, 1980)
   Valseando Festejos (Iempsa, 1981)
   Seguimos Valseando Festejos (Iempsa, 1982)
   El Sabor de Lucila Campos (Iempsa, 1984)
   Quimba, Lisura y Sabor (Virrey, 1985)
   Sabor...y más Sabor (Virrey, 1988)
Black Peru
In 1969 he would be part of the Afro-Peruvian cultural association Peru Negro for 17 years, a group led by the distinguished musician Ronaldo Campos. That same year, in the month of October, they won the Hispano-American Festival of Dance and Song, an event that took place at Luna Park in Buenos Aires, Argentina.

The aforementioned musical program was entitled La Tierra se Hizo Nuestra, and contained celebrated recordings such as "El Payandé", "Pobre Negrita", "El Alcatraz", among others. Something remarkable was that that day the artist while singing one of her numbers, the sound would suddenly fail, turning off all the microphones on the stage, before the surprised look of the spectators, she continued singing a cappella without showing any difficulty or discomfort. Here her energetic and remarkable voice was noted that would accompany her during her musical career.

References

1938 births
2016 deaths
20th-century Peruvian women singers
20th-century Peruvian singers